The 1995–96 Georgian Cup (also known as the David Kipiani Cup) was the fifty-second season overall and sixth since independence of the Georgian annual football tournament.

Round of 32 

|}

Round of 16 

|}

Quarterfinals 

|}

Semifinals 

|}

Final

See also 
 1995–96 Umaglesi Liga
 1995–96 Pirveli Liga

References

External links 
 The Rec.Sport.Soccer Statistics Foundation.

Georgian Cup seasons
Cup
Georgian Cup, 1997-98